The Mie potential is an intermolecular pair potential, i.e. it describes the interactions between particles at the atomic level. 

The model is attributed to the German physicist Gustave Mie. The Mie potential is the generalized case of the Lennard-Jones (LJ) potential, which is perhaps the single most widely used pair potential. 

with

 .

(1). 
In Eq. The parameter  is generally indicative of the size of the particles involved in the collision. The parameters  and  characterize the shape of the potential:  describes the character of the repulsion and  describes the character of the attraction.

The attractive exponent  is physically justified by the London dispersion force, whereas no justification for a certain value for the repulsive exponent is known. The repulsive steepness parameter  has a significant influence on the modelling of thermodynamic derivative properties, e.g. the compressibility and the speed of sound. Therefore, the Mie potential is a more flexible and better generalized intermolecular potential than the simpler Lennard-Jones potential. 

The Mie potential is used today in state-of-the-art force fields in molecular modeling. Typically, the attractive exponent is chosen to be , whereas the repulsive exponent is used as an adjustable parameter during the model fitting. Thermophysical properties of systems modeled with the Mie potential have been the subject of numerous papers in recent years, including virial coefficients and interfacial and vapor-liquid equilibrium properties.

References 

Thermodynamics
Intermolecular forces
Computational chemistry
Quantum mechanical potentials